Thornton High School is the name of numerous high schools in the United States, including:

 Thornton High School (Colorado) in Thornton, Colorado
 Thornton Township High School in Harvey, Illinois
 Thornton Fractional South High School in Lansing, Illinois
 Thornton Fractional North High School in Calumet City, Illinois
 Thornton High School in the Jefferson Union High School District in Daly City, California
 Thornton High School (Iowa), a defunct high school in Thornton, Iowa